Chen Yunhua (born September 14, 1999) is a Chinese football player who currently plays for Hebei China Fortune in the Chinese Super League.

Playing career
Chen Yunhua would play for the Hebei China Fortune youth team before he joined Japanese J3 League club Grulla Morioka on 28 March 2018. He would make his debut on 11 November 2018 in a league game against YSCC Yokohama that ended in a 3-2 victory. At the end of the season he returned to Hebei who loaned him out to third tier football club Wuhan Three Towns in the 2020 China League Two season. At his time in Wuhan he would go on to aid them in winning the division title and promotion into the second tier.

Career statistics
.

Honours

Club
Wuhan Three Towns
China League Two: 2020

References

External links

1999 births
Living people
Chinese footballers
J3 League players
Iwate Grulla Morioka players
Association football midfielders